Nagasaki Shinchi Chinatown (Japanese: 長崎新地中華街, Simplified Chinese: 长崎新地中华街) is an area located in Nagasaki, Nagasaki, Japan. Today this area is a shopping strip covering many blocks. 

Most of the Chinese members of Nagasaki Chinatown are of Fuzhounese descent. Nagasaki and Fuzhou established ties as sister cities in 1980 to recognize the historical connections between the two cities and Fuzhounese immigrant community.

History
This area was originally the location of the warehouses of Chinese merchants, who traded goods to Japan from the 15th to 19th centuries. They lived in the 'Chinese residence' (Tojin yashiki) a little to the south-east (today's Kannaimachi 館内町). 

The Chinese traders came to Nagasaki because it was the only open port in Japan during the Tokugawa period. The Tokugawa government allowed only Nagasaki to stay open to Chinese and Dutch traders, closing off the rest of Japan to prevent European political influence and the spread of Christianity. 

Strict rules were placed on these Chinese traders, forcing them to stay within the precincts of the Tojin yashiki at night. Anyone found outside the area during prohibited times was arrested by the local guard.

See also
 Chinatowns in Asia
 Yokohama Chinatown
 Nankin-machi (“Nanjing Town” in Kobe)
 Chinese in Japan
 China
 Koreatown in Japan
 Hong Kong

References

External links
 Official site of Nagasaki Shinchi Chinatown (Japanese)
 Nagasaki Lantern Festival (Japanese)
 
 

Chinatowns in Asia
Chinese-Japanese culture
Tourist attractions in Nagasaki Prefecture